Laukaha is a very old Border Town in the district of Madhubani in the Indian state of Bihar. It is close to the border with Nepal and the Nepalese town of Thadi. The population of Laukaha is between 11, 000 and 15, 000.

Laukaha has a primary school, high school, inter college, a police station, a post office, a branch of State Bank of India & Gramin Bank in the market.

Laukaha has three main temples - Panchanath (Lord Shiva temple), Bhagwati temple (Maa Durga temple) and Ramjanki temple (Lord Rama temple).
The town was historically part of Karnad Dynasty of Mithila Kings starting from Nanyadeva.
Entire Terai region of Nepal was under this dynasty until British ceded part of Tirhut region Terai to Nepal.

The River Bhutahi balan also draws people to the town for tourism; it is a tributary of the River Kosi. During the festive season of chhath, devotees visit this river to offer  prayers to the God Sun.
Laukaha has a railway station also.

Laukaha in India and Thadi in Nepal are a part of one of the agreed route for Mutual Trade between India and Nepal. Nepal Government of Nepal has set up a dedicated customs office in the town. and Government of India has set up a Land Customs Station with a Superintendent level officer. So in simple Import and Export are allowed in this location.

Nearest city in Nepal is Lahan, Nepal where there is a popular Eye Hospital by name of Sagarmatha Choudhary Eye Hospital, Lahan.

Transportation
Now Laukaha is well connected to NH 57 via Khutauna to Phulparas. Approximate distance from Laukaha to Phulparas is 30 km.
Laukaha is also connected through Bus service to Kathmandu and other Napless Town. Laukha is connected by bus service to all the big cities of Bihar as well as to New Delhi. Nearest railway station is Jayanagar around 35 km. A broad gauge railway line has been in the construction phase. There are various bus operators who operate direct bus from adjacent Thadi to Kathmandu via Lahan, Nepal which is 18 km north of Thadi and also connects to Mahendra Highway. It is one of the major routes for tourist from India to go to travel Nepal.

Nearest airport is in Nepal Rajbiraj Airport which is around 40 km away. Shree Airlines operates daily flight between Rajbiraj and Kathmandu. Flight time is approximately 25 mins.
Nearest Airport is in India Darbhanga Airport which is around 80 km away & connect to different cities in India.

References 

Villages in Madhubani district